Gábor Pozsár (born 29 March 1981 in Békéscsaba) is a Hungarian football (forward) player who currently plays for Békéscsaba 1912 Előre SE.

Club statistics

Updated to games played as of 1 June 2014.

External links
HLSZ 
MLSZ 
Futball-adattar 

1981 births
Living people
People from Békéscsaba
Hungarian footballers
Association football forwards
Békéscsaba 1912 Előre footballers
Orosháza FC players
Szolnoki MÁV FC footballers
Nemzeti Bajnokság I players
Sportspeople from Békés County
21st-century Hungarian people